Clifford Eugene Koroll (born October 1, 1946) is a Canadian former professional ice hockey right winger who played for the Chicago Blackhawks of the National Hockey League between 1969 and 1980. He featured in two Stanley Cup Finals with the Blackhawks (1971, 1973).

After earning all-WCHA honours at the University of Denver in 1968, Koroll signed an NHL contract and played his entire National Hockey League career with the Chicago Blackhawks. He then became as assistant coach for the Blackhawks for six seasons (1980–1984 and 1985–1987). In the 1984–85 season he served as head coach for the Milwaukee Admirals of the International Hockey League.

Koroll currently serves as president of the Chicago Blackhawks Alumni Association. On October 19, 2006 he was inducted into the Hockey Hall of Fame at his alma mater, the University of Denver. He was also inducted into the Chicago Sports Hall of Fame. In the summer of 2015, he was inducted into the Saskatchewan Sports Hall Of Fame.

Career statistics

Awards and honours

References

External links

1946 births
Living people
Canadian ice hockey right wingers
Chicago Blackhawks players
Ice hockey people from Saskatchewan
People from Canora, Saskatchewan
NCAA men's ice hockey national champions